The 2003 FIFA Women's World Cup was the fourth edition of the FIFA Women's World Cup, the quadrennial championship of women's national soccer teams organized by FIFA. It was held in the United States from September 20 to October 12, 2003, at six venues in six cities across the country. The tournament was won by Germany, who became the first country to win both the men's and women's World Cup.

China was originally awarded the right to host the tournament, which would have taken place from September 23 to October 11 in four cities. A severe outbreak of SARS in early 2003 affected Guangdong in southern China and prompted FIFA to move the Women's World Cup to the United States, who had hosted the previous edition in 1999. China was instead granted hosting rights for the 2007 FIFA Women's World Cup and financial compensation while the United States Soccer Federation made new arrangements to host at smaller stadiums.

Preparations

Host selection and change

FIFA awarded hosting rights for the Women's World Cup to China on October 26, 2000, beating a bid by Australia. The tournament was originally planned to run from September 23 to October 11 at venues in Shanghai, Wuhan, Chengdu, and Hangzhou. Several sporting events in China were canceled or postponed in early April due to the outbreak of SARS in southern China, including the official draw for the Women's World Cup, and FIFA launched a joint investigation with the World Health Organization into whether the outbreak would subside by the time of the tournament. The United States, Canada, and Australia were mentioned as potential replacement hosts at the time.

On May 3, 2003, FIFA announced that they would move the tournament to an alternate host country, which would be determined at a later date; the United States and Australia had expressed interest in hosting, while Brazil was floated as another potential host. FIFA also announced that they would instead award the 2007 FIFA Women's World Cup and pay $1 million to the organizing committee to compensate for planning expenses. On May 26, 2003, the United States was announced as the tournament's new host, ahead of the other formal bid submitted by Sweden. The United States was judged to be a suitable emergency host because of their experience with organizing the 1999 tournament, despite potential conflicts in the fall sports schedule with American football and baseball. Women's soccer boosters in the United States also hoped that interest generated by the tournament would save the struggling professional league, the Women's United Soccer Association, from folding; the league ultimately folded a few days before the tournament began in September.

Venues

The tournament's 32 matches were played at six venues and organized into 15 doubleheaders, with the exception of the third-place and final matches, which were played on separate days. The Los Angeles area repeated as host of the final, which was moved from the Rose Bowl to the Home Depot Center, a smaller stadium in Carson, California. The matches were scheduled in doubleheaders and moved from four venues on the East Coast to two on the West Coast as it progressed to later matchdays. The size and scope of the tournament were also reduced from the 1999 edition due to the limited time to organize and prepare for the event.

Mostly due to the rescheduling of the tournament on short notice, FIFA and the United States Soccer Federation were forced to creatively schedule matches. Nine doubleheaders were scheduled in group play (similar to the 1999 format). They also had to abandon the modern practice of scheduling the final matches of the group stage to kick off simultaneously. In Groups A and D, the final matches were scheduled as the two ends of a doubleheader. The final matches in Groups B and C were also scheduled as doubleheaders, but split between two cities, with a Group B match in each city followed by a Group C match. The four quarterfinals were also scheduled as two doubleheaders, and both semifinals were also a doubleheader.

The host stadiums were announced on June 13, 2003, including three large stadiums to open the tournament and three small, soccer-specific stadiums for later stages. Giants Stadium in the New York City area backed out of hosting after being unable to resolve scheduling issues with the New York Giants. For the tournament, Portland's newly renovated PGE Park (formerly Civic Stadium) received a new grass surface and temporary seating to expand capacity to 28,359; it had previously hosted several matches during the 1999 tournament. Gillette Stadium replaced the demolished Foxboro Stadium, while RFK Stadium was chosen in place of Jack Kent Cooke Stadium in the Washington, D.C. area. The venues also employed new security measures that were required by the U.S. government following the September 11 attacks in 2001.

Participating teams and officials

Qualification

Sixteen teams participated in the 2003 Women's World Cup, determined by a set of continental qualification tournaments that took place from August 18, 2001, to July 12, 2003. Three teams, Argentina, France, and South Korea, made their Women's World Cup debuts in the 2003 tournament. The remaining thirteen teams had competed in the previous World Cup.

China was granted automatic qualification as the host and retained it after the United States were named the replacement host. The remaining fifteen participants, including the replacement host, were determined through a series of continental tournaments from a field of 99 teams. FIFA allocated five berths to Europe; two each to Africa,  Asia, North America, and South America (increased by one from the 1999 tournament); and one to Oceania. The 2003 Women's World Cup was also used to determine the two European participants in the 2004 Summer Olympics.

Squads
For a list of all squads that played in the final tournament, see 2003 FIFA Women's World Cup squads.

Match officials

Draw

The group draw was originally scheduled to take place on May 24, 2003, in Wuhan, China, but was postponed prior to the relocation decision. It instead took place at the Home Depot Center in Carson, California on July 17, 2003, and included a formal handover ceremony for the FIFA Women's World Cup trophy, which was given to U.S. coach April Heinrichs by Chinese coach Ma Liangxing. FIFA also unveiled its Women's World Rankings system, which was used to determine seeded groups and retroactively calculated points for over 3,000 international fixtures dating back to 1971.

The United States was placed in Group A and China was placed in Group D, while Norway and Germany were also seeded in Pot 1. The remaining three pots were distributed geographically to prevent two teams from the same confederation from being drawn into the same group, with the exception of one group that would have two European teams. The hosting United States was drawn into the tournament's "Group of death" alongside Sweden, Nigeria, and North Korea—all considered strong teams from their respective confederations.

Group stage

The tournament format was unchanged from the 1999 edition, with the first round consisting of sixteen teams organized into four groups by the final draw. The round-robin group stage consisted of 24 matches in which each team played one match against the other three teams in their group. The winners and runners-up from each group qualified for the knockout stage, which began with the quarter-finals.

Group A

Group A included three teams from the previous edition's Group A—hosts and defending champions United States, African champions Nigeria, and Asian champions North Korea—alongside European runners-up Sweden. It was dubbed the tournament's "Group of death" at the time of the final draw, due to the presence of three continental champions and a runner-up. Nigeria were defeated 3–0 by North Korea in the opening match of the tournament, played in Philadelphia on September 20, with two goals by Jin Pyol-hui and one by Ri Un-gyong during a dominating performance for most of the match. The United States began its title defense by winning 3–1 in its match against Sweden in Washington, D.C. at RFK Memorial Stadium, which was attended by 34,144 spectators. A header by Victoria Svensson in the 58th minute cut the lead, but the two-goal margin was restored in the 78th minute by Shannon Boxx's header on a corner kick.

Sweden won 1–0 in its second match, played against North Korea in Philadelphia, with a seventh-minute volley by Svensson. The Swedish defense limited North Korea to a single shot in the first half, but goalkeeper Ri Jong-hui prevented a rout with several saves. The United States moved further ahead in group standings with a 5–0 defeat of Nigeria, but were unable to clinch an early quarterfinal berth. Mia Hamm, the longtime face of the team, scored from a penalty kick in the sixth minute and a  free kick in the twelfth minute. Her strike partner, Cindy Parlow, scored a goal of her own just after halftime by heading in a corner kick taken by Hamm. Substitute forward Abby Wambach scored her first Women's World Cup goal and the match's final goal came from a penalty kick taken in the 89th minute by Julie Foudy.

The third matchday, played as a doubleheader in Columbus, began with Sweden's 3–0 win over Nigeria to earn a quarterfinal berth by finishing second in the group. After a scoreless first half, striker Hanna Ljungberg broke the deadlock in the 56th minute with a header and added a second in the 79th minute; Swedish captain Malin Moström then scored a third goal for her team two minutes later on a breakaway, capping a dominating offensive performance with 14 shots on target. The United States benched several of its starting players in their final group stage match against North Korea, which was the first World Cup match without star striker Mia Hamm. The hosts took the lead in the 17th minute from a penalty kick that was awarded for a foul on Tiffeny Milbrett and scored by Abby Wambach. Cat Reddick, the only college player on the U.S. roster, scored from a deflection in the 48th minute and a header in the 66th minute as the United States won 3–0 and finished at the top of Group A.

Group B

In Group B, 1999 semifinalists Brazil and Norway were joined by Women's World Cup debutantes France and South Korea. Norway and France had played in the same continental qualification group, finishing first and second in their group; France qualified for the final European berth by winning a two-stage play-off series against Denmark and England. Norway won 2–0 in their opening match against France, with second-half goals from a header by Anita Rapp and rebound by captain Dagny Mellgren. Brazil defeated South Korea 3–0 in their opener, with a penalty scored by 17-year-old midfielder Marta in the 14th minute and two second-half goals from forward Kátia.

Brazil moved to the top of Group B with a 4–1 defeat of Norway, who were unexpectedly overpowered by the younger members of the Brazil squad. 19-year-old Daniela scored in the 26th minute after a long run through the Norwegian defense and was followed by 21-year-old defender Rosana's header off a free kick in the 37th minute. Norwegian forward Marianne Pettersen scored with a header before halftime to bring the team within one goal of equalizing, but a tap-in from Marta and header by Kátia in the second half earned Brazil their upset victory. The second doubleheader of the matchday ended with South Korea's 1–0 loss to France, with the team's first World Cup goal scored in the 84th minute by Marinette Pichon; as a result, France and Norway were left tied in second place with the possibility of a three-way tie at the end of the group stage.

Norway rebounded from its loss to Brazil by defeating South Korea 7–1 to qualify for the quarterfinals as the second-placed team in the group. Dagny Mellgren scored twice in the first half and also recorded two assists on goals by Solveig Gulbrandsen in the fifth minute and Marianne Pettersen before halftime. Defender Brit Sandaune scored from a  volley early in the second half and was joined on the score-sheet by Linda Ørmen, who entered the match as a substitute in the 69th minute and scored twice at the end of the match. Kim Jin-hee earned a consolation goal, her nation's first in a World Cup, from a defensive mistake in the 75th minute. Brazil took the lead against France in its final group stage match in the 58th minute, through a goal from Kátia, but conceded in stoppage time to a finish by Pichon. The match ended in a 1–1 draw, but Brazil finished atop the group standings and advanced to the quarterfinals.

Group C

Group C included 1995 runners-up Germany, North American runners-up Canada; Japan, who qualified through an inter-continental play-off; and debutants Argentina. In the opening match of the first group doubleheader in Columbus, Christine Sinclair scored her first Women's World Cup goal in the fourth minute from a header to give Canada the lead. Germany then equalized from a penalty kick before halftime, awarded for a handball, and completed a 4–1 comeback victory with three goals in the second half by Birgit Prinz and substitute Kerstin Garefrekes. The second match in Columbus ended with Argentina being defeated 6–0 by Japan, with two goals from Homare Sawa and a hat-trick scored by Mio Otani in an eight-minute span in the second half. Argentina lost forward Natalia Gatti to a red card in the 39th minute, opening the team to attacks form the Japanese.

The second matchday's doubleheader, also played in Columbus, ended with 3–0 victories for Germany over Japan and Canada over Argentina. Germany took advantage of their taller players and physicality to shutout Japan, liming them to a handful of chances. Sandra Minnert scored on a rebound from a corner kick in the 23rd minute and was followed by a pair of goals from forward Birgit Prinz in the 36th and 66th minute, both from overturned balls in the midfield. Canada earned its first World Cup victory in its eighth match with a pair of goals scored by Christine Latham, who also won a penalty in the 19th minute that opened the scoring against Argentina. The victory put Canada level on points with Japan for second place in the group, setting up a winner-take-all scenario in their match against each other.

Canada earned its first quarterfinal berth by defeating Japan 3–1 in their final group stage match, despite conceding to Japan's star midfielder Homare Sawa in the 20th minute. Latham equalized with her chipped shot in the 36th minute and Canada took the lead after halftime with a header by Christine Sinclair and a strike by Kara Lang in the 72nd minute. Germany finished atop the group with three wins following their 6–1 rout of Argentina, including four goals scored in the first half. The team lost defender Steffi Jones to a knee injury in the second half and conceded a consolation goal to Argentina before scoring twice at the end of the match to extend their lead.

Group D

Original hosts and 1999 runners-up China were seeded into Group D, where they would play alongside African runners-up Ghana, Oceania champions Australia, and 1999 quarter-finalist Russia. Australia continued their Women's World Cup winless streak by losing 2–1 to Russia in the opening match, despite taking a 1–0 lead in the 38th minute through a goal from Kelly Golebiowski. Russia tied the match a minute later with an own goal from Dianne Alagich and Elena Fomina scored their second in the 89th minute with a strike from the edge of the penalty area. China, considered the favorites to  top the group, won 1–0 in their opener against Ghana with a goal by Sun Wen, who was the top goalscorer in the 1999 World Cup.

Russia secured its quarterfinal berth by defeating Ghana 3–0 in their second match, which took them to first place in the group. They opened the scoring in the 36th minute with a free kick taken by Marina Saenko, which was followed by a pair of close-range shots in the second half from Natalia Barbashina and Olga Letyushova. Group favorites China had unexpectedly conceded to Australia in the first half of their match, with a goal in the 28th minute for midfielder Heather Garriock, that would have snapped a winless World Cup record for the Matildas. A potential equalizer in the first half from Sun Wen was saved off the line by Cheryl Salisbury, but Bai Jie was able to score shortly after halftime to earn a draw for China and prevent an upset victory for Australia.

Australia continued its winless streak in World Cup play after losing 2–1 in its final group stage match against Ghana, who had also been eliminated from advancing to the quarterfinals. Ghanaian striker Alberta Sackey, who had been named Africa's best female player, scored twice within five minutes near the end of the first half—once from long range and the other from a rebound on a saved shot. Heather Garriock cut the lead in the 61st minute with her goal and Australia pressed for an equalizer, but were unable to score and finished at the bottom of the group. China qualified for the quarterfinals through Australia's elimination and won 1–0 against Russia to finish atop the group standings. Bai Jie scored the lone goal of the match in the 16th minute, despite China's 18 shots—of which seven were saved by Russian goalkeeper Alla Volkova.

Knockout stage

Bracket

Quarter-finals

The first quarterfinal doubleheader was played at Gillette Stadium in Foxborough, Massachusetts, with the ordering of the matches swapped to allow a later kickoff for the U.S. match. Sweden took the lead against Brazil in the first match of the night, with a header by Victoria Svensson in the 23rd minute in the run of play. A minute before halftime, Marta drew and scored an equalizing penalty for Brazil after being tripped by goalkeeper Sofia Lundgren, who was starting in place of Caroline Jönsson because of her drug treatment for stomach cramps. Malin Andersson scored the winning goal for Sweden in the 53rd minute from a  free kick as Sweden resisted several chances from Brazil and a controversial uncalled foul in the penalty area during stoppage time to win 2–1. The United States played Norway in their quarterfinal match-up, which pitted two of the tournament favorites and ended in a 1–0 victory for the hosts. Abby Wambach scored in the 24th minute from a header off Cat Reddick's free kick from  while also creating other chances to score to no avail. The U.S. failed to extend their lead in the 68th minute, with a penalty kick taken by Mia Hamm that was blocked by goalkeeper Bente Nordby.

The second doubleheader was played between teams from Groups C and D at PGE Park in Portland, Oregon, which would also host the semifinals. Germany advanced to the semifinals with a 7–1 defeat of Russia, who matched Chinese Taipei in conceding the most goals in a Women's World Cup quarterfinal. The Germans led 1–0 at halftime, with a goal by Martina Müller in the 25th minute, but scored three times within a five-minute span to open the second half after breaking down the Russian defense. After conceding a consolation goal to Elena Danilova in the 70th minute, Germany scored three times in the final ten minutes, including a pair from Brigit Prinz and a second for Kerstin Garefrekes, to close out the match. Canada then achieved an upset defeat of China in their quarterfinal match, taking an early lead in the seventh minute through a header from Charmaine Hooper and maintaining a shutout to win 1–0 despite several scoring chances for the Chinese.

Semi-finals

Germany advanced to their second Women's World Cup final by defeating the United States 3–0 in a major upset of the defending champions in Portland, only their second loss in a Women's World Cup. Germany took the lead in the 15th minute through a header by Kerstin Garefrekes and held onto the shutout, despite the U.S. switching formations to produce attacking chances that often required saves from goalkeeper Silke Rottenberg. The German defense remained resilient to the long-ball play of the United States, which increased in intensity and frequency during the second half—producing six shots on target. Maren Meinert and Brigit Prinz scored a pair of goals in stoppage time, taking advantage of the vulnerable American defense with their counterattacks.

The second semifinal fixture, between Canada and Sweden, remained scoreless through the end of the first hour of play despite chances created by Canadian fullback–forward Charmaine Hooper. Sweden made three substitutions to bring on attacking players and won a free kick in the 79th minute that was quickly taken by Victoria Svensson and passed to Malin Moström, who scored the equalizer. Substitute forward Josefine Öqvist scored the winning goal for Sweden six minutes later, finishing a rebound off a shot by Hanna Ljungberg that was saved by goalkeeper Taryn Swiatek.

Third place play-off

The third-place play-off was played on the day before the final at the Home Depot Center in Carson, California, between the United States and their continental rivals Canada. The U.S. retained its mix of veteran and youth players who played in the semifinals and controlled play for most of the match, taking the lead in the 22nd minute through a long throw-in by Abby Wambach that was volleyed into the goal by Kristine Lilly. Christine Sinclair equalized for Canada within 16 minutes, but the U.S. kept pressing in the second half and re-took the lead in the 51st minute through a header by Shannon Boxx from a corner kick. Tiffeny Milbrett, who was substituted in for Cindy Parlow after she sustained a concussion before halftime, then scored the team's final goal of the tournament in the 80th minute by finishing a rebound off an earlier shot that was blocked at the goal line.

Final

Germany defeated Sweden in the Women's World Cup final to earn their first world championship and become the first country to win both the men's and women's tournament, as well as the first to win with a female manager. Germany responded with an equalizing goal in the first minute of the second half, with Maren Meinert scoring in the penalty area on a rebound off goalkeeper Caroline Jönsson. The match remained tied after regulation time and was decided by a golden goal scored in the 98th minute by substitute defender Nia Künzer, who headed in a shot from a free kick taken by Renate Lingor.

Awards

German striker Birgit Prinz was awarded the Golden Ball for her play in the tournament and the Golden Shoe, having scored seven goals. She was later named the FIFA Women's World Player of the Year for 2003, 2004, and 2005. Germany's Kerstin Garefrekes also finished the tournament with four goals and no assists, Kátia won the Bronze Shoe by having played fewer minutes (only 360, compared to the 409 minutes of Garefrekes).

FIFA.com shortlisted six teams, the four semi-finalist teams and two other sides chosen by FIFA (Brazil and China), for users to vote on as the tournaments' most entertaining, with the poll closing on October 10, 2003.

All-Star Team
The tournament's sixteen-member all-star team, including eleven starters and five substitutes, was selected by the FIFA Technical Study Group and announced on October 8, 2003, by President Joseph Blatter. Germany had five members named to the starting lineup, while runners-up Sweden had two starters and one substitute. Several members of the All-Star Team were later named to the FIFA Women's All Star Team that played against Germany on May 20, 2004, for the centennial anniversary of FIFA.

The "FANtasy All-Star Team", which was sponsored by MasterCard, featured eleven players decided by a poll on FIFA.com.

Statistics

Goalscorers

Assists

Tournament ranking

References

External links

FIFA Women's World Cup USA 2003, FIFA.com
FIFA Technical Report

 
2003
2003
2003 in women's association football
2003 in American women's soccer
September 2003 sports events in the United States
October 2003 sports events in the United States